Justin Schwartz is an American nuclear engineer. Since August 15, 2017, he has served as the Harold and Inge Marcus Dean of Engineering at Penn State College of Engineering. During his earlier tenure at North Carolina State University as head of the Department of Materials Science and Engineering, he received that university's diversity award in 2011 for expanding the female faculty of the department twofold and hiring the first professors who were minorities.

Career 
A native of Illinois, Schwartz attended the University of Illinois at Urbana before pursuing a graduate degree in nuclear engineering at the Massachusetts Institute of Technology. After graduation, he relocated briefly to Japan, where he served at the National Research Institute for Metals as one of the first Science and Technology Agency of Japan Fellows. After returning to the United States, he worked at his undergraduate alma-mater as an assistant professor before moving to Florida State University as the lead of the HTS Magnets and Materials Group. In 2009, he relocated to North Carolina State University as Kobe Steel Distinguished Professor, where he led the Department of Materials Science and Engineering. During his tenure there, Schwartz worked to increase the diversity of the engineering department, doubling the number of female faculty and bringing into the college its first professors who were minorities in that field. For this work, he received the university's diversity award.  In August 2017, he received the role of Harold and Inge Marcus Dean of Engineering at Penn State College of Engineering.

Schwartz's areas of focus include superconductivity and electronic materials. In 1998, he received the Boom award from the Cryogenic Society of America for "significant contributions to the development of high temperature superconductors for high field systems including NMR, MagLev and energy storage technologies." In 2018, he received the John Bardeen Award from the TMS Functional Material Division for outstanding contributions from a leader in the field of electronic materials.

In 2014, Schwartz was named a fellow of the AAAS for his contributions to science in the area of industrial science and technology.

References

University of Illinois Urbana-Champaign alumni
MIT School of Engineering alumni
American nuclear engineers
Pennsylvania State University faculty
North Carolina State University faculty
Fellows of the American Association for the Advancement of Science